McAneny is a surname. Notable people with the surname include:

Douglas J. McAneny (born 1955), United States Navy admiral
George McAneny (1869–1953), American newspaperman and politician
Joseph McAneny (1924–2007), American politician

See also
McAnany
McEnany (surname)